These are the Billboard magazine Hot Dance Airplay number one hits of 2005.

Note that Billboard publishes charts with an issue date approximately 7–10 days in advance.

See also
2005 in music
List of number-one dance singles of 2005 (U.S.)

References

United States Dance Airplay
2005